In enzymology, a pantoate—β-alanine ligase is an enzyme that catalyzes the chemical reaction

ATP + (R)-pantoate + β-alanine  AMP + diphosphate + (R)-pantothenate

The 3 substrates of this enzyme are ATP, (R)-pantoate, and beta-alanine, whereas its 3 products are AMP, diphosphate, and (R)-pantothenate.

This enzyme belongs to the family of ligases, specifically those forming carbon-nitrogen bonds as acid-D-amino-acid ligases (peptide synthases).  The systematic name of this enzyme class is (R)-pantoate:beta-alanine ligase (AMP-forming). Other names in common use include pantothenate synthetase, pantoate activating enzyme, pantoic-activating enzyme, and D-pantoate:beta-alanine ligase (AMP-forming).  This enzyme participates in beta-alanine metabolism and pantothenate and CoA biosynthesis.

Structural studies

References

 
 
 

EC 6.3.2
Enzymes of known structure